Abdalla Haji Ali (born 1 January 1964) is a Tanzanian ACT Wazalendo politician and Member of Parliament for Kiwani constituency since 2010 to 2020.

References

Living people
1964 births
Civic United Front MPs
Tanzanian MPs 2010–2015
Lumumba Secondary School alumni
Zanzibari politicians
Alliance for Change and Transparency politicians